Wharewaka is a suburb of Taupō, New Zealand. It stretches from Rainbow Point to Five Mile Bay on the west side of State Highway 1. Wharewaka lies on a small point of land next to Lake Taupo and 1.6 km northwest of the Taupo Airport. 

Wharewaka has a large proportion of holiday homes. Recent developments such as the Wharewaka Point Development and the Lakeside development have seen a rise in population.

Wharewaka Point is a busy swimming beach during the summer. It is popular with Tourists and locals alike.

Wharewaka is also the location of the Summerset retirement village.

After an M5.7 earthquake on 30 November 2022, 170 metres of the shoreline at Wharewaka Point collapsed into the lake.

Demographics 

Wharewaka had a population of 939 at the 2018 New Zealand census, an increase of 225 people (31.5%) since the 2013 census, and an increase of 462 people (96.9%) since the 2006 census. There were 444 households, comprising 432 males and 507 females, giving a sex ratio of 0.85 males per female. The median age was 57.5 years (compared with 37.4 years nationally), with 126 people (13.4%) aged under 15 years, 84 (8.9%) aged 15 to 29, 360 (38.3%) aged 30 to 64, and 369 (39.3%) aged 65 or older.

Ethnicities were 93.0% European/Pākehā, 7.7% Māori, 1.3% Pacific peoples, 4.2% Asian, and 0.6% other ethnicities. People may identify with more than one ethnicity.

The percentage of people born overseas was 18.8, compared with 27.1% nationally.

Although some people chose not to answer the census's question about religious affiliation, 44.4% had no religion, 47.0% were Christian, 0.3% had Māori religious beliefs, 0.3% were Hindu, 0.6% were Muslim, 1.0% were Buddhist and 1.0% had other religions.

Of those at least 15 years old, 171 (21.0%) people had a bachelor's or higher degree, and 147 (18.1%) people had no formal qualifications. The median income was $30,200, compared with $31,800 nationally. 165 people (20.3%) earned over $70,000 compared to 17.2% nationally. The employment status of those at least 15 was that 291 (35.8%) people were employed full-time, 111 (13.7%) were part-time, and 9 (1.1%) were unemployed.

References

External links
Wharewaka Point
Zoom In map
Government stats

Suburbs of Taupō
Populated places on Lake Taupō